By 2012, Iran had roughly 400 power plant units. By the end of 2013, Iran had a total installed electricity generation capacity of 70,000 MW, which had been increased from 90 MW in 1948, and 7024 MW in 1978.  It is planned to add more than 5,000 MW of generation capacity annually to the power grid, which will almost double the total power generation capacity to 122,000 MW by 2022. The government of Iran plans to privatize 20 power plants by September 2010. Iran's peak demand for electricity was 45,693 MW during the summer of 2013.

It was predicted Iran accounts for 17.08% of MENA power generation by 2014. The natural gas was the major fuel used to generate electricity in Iran in 2009, accounting for an estimated 56.8% of primary energy demand (PED), followed by oil at 40.8% and hydro power at 1.4%. As of 2010, the average efficiency of power plants in Iran was 38 percent. The figure should reach to 45 percent within five years and 50 percent under Vision 2025.

Electricity generation in 2008, accounted for 203.8 billion kWh or roughly one percent of world's total production, which was increased by 5.9 percent comparing with the year before. In 2008, the total electricity generated was 190.2 billion kWh which 93.3% was generated by power plants affiliated with the Ministry of Energy and 13.6 billion kWh (6.7%) by other institutions, which were mostly from the private sector. The largest share of electricity (91.1 billion kWh) was generated by steam power plants while diesel power plants accounted for the smallest share of generation (0.2 billion kWh). In 2008, the highest growth in generation of electricity belonged to gas and combined cycle power plants with 9.3 percent growth rate while the amount of electricity generated by hydroelectric power plants declined by 1.7 percent. As of 2010, the consumer price of electricity in Iran was 1.6 US cents per kilowatt hour while the real production cost was about 8.0 US cents. (See also: Cost of electricity by different sources)

In 2010, 900,000 jobs were directly or indirectly related to the power industry in Iran. Currently, Iran's spares power capacity stands at 3 per cent, but this amount is much lower than the ideal 25 percent of peak power used. It has been estimated that 23.5 percent of the electricity generation is wasted in the transmission network. Iran's power grid has been connected to seven neighboring countries Afghanistan, Pakistan, Iraq, Turkey, Armenia, Azerbaijan and Turkmenistan and annually, exports 5.5 TWh of electricity.

Manufacturing

Electric power industry in Iran has become self-sufficient in producing the required equipment to build power plants. While most of the electricity generators are run by the government, the equipment producers and contractors are generally from the private sector. Iran is among the top ten manufacturers of gas turbines with a capacity up to 160 megawatts. Iran engineers at JEMCO (a subsidiary of IDRO) have succeeded to develop and produce one and four-megawatt generators. Iran can manufacture materials for over 80 percent of hydraulic turbines and over 90 percent of gas turbines. In the near future, Iran can become a major player in building power plant with advanced technology (2009). Iran plans to build its first indigenous gas turbines by 2015. Iran has achieved the technical expertise to setup hydroelectric, gas and combined cycle power plants. Iran is one of the four countries in the world which can manufacture advanced V94.2 gas turbines. The Industrial Development and Renovation Organization of Iran (IDRO) is currently building the country's first 4-megawatt (MW) Combined Heat and Power (CHP) turbo generator in cooperation with the private sector.

Nuclear power plants

Darkhovin Nuclear Power Plant is Iran's first indigenously designed and built power plant besides the research reactor of IR-40.
Bushehr Nuclear Power Plant is Iran's first nuclear power plant and it has been manufactured with the technical assistance of Russia.

International projects
Iran is not only self-sufficient in power plant construction but has also concluded a number of contracts on implementing projects in neighboring states. As of 2010, Iranian energy and resource development firms are involved in 50 projects worth over USD 2.2 billion in more than 20 countries across the world. As at 2011, MAPNA was building power plants in Syria, Oman and Iraq and negotiations were underway to build two power plants in Lebanon.

One of Iran’s most important international projects will see the construction of a $200-million hydroelectric dam in Nicaragua starting 2011. Iran is currently engaged in dam construction in Tajikistan, Armenia and Azerbaijan, and consultations are underway with a number of other countries. Kenya, Sri Lanka, Bolivia and Mali are the potential target markets being considered for exporting the country’s technical and engineering services. In 2010, Iran won a contract to build a dam in Afghanistan and the third contract to build a power plant station in Syria.
In December 2005 a wind farm was put in operation at Pushkin Pass in Armenia. Total installed capacity of the farm is 2.64 MW, comprise from the four 660 kW wind turbines. Wind farm was built by support of 3.1 mln US$ grant from the government of Islamic Republic of Iran. The Armenian and Iranian energy sectors are currently jointly constructing the Iran-Armenia Wind Farm which is set to become the country's largest wind farm, having an installed electric capacity of 90 MW. As at 2012, Iran is building seven large power plants in Syria, Oman, Iraq, and Tajikistan.

Foreign direct investment

According to the Ministry of Energy, Germany has invested $445 million in construction of the Pareh-Sar combined cycle power plant in northern Iran, while the UAE has invested $720 million in construction of a gas power plant as well as a combined cycle power plant in Isfahan and Shiraz. In 2015, Iran and Russia signed an agreement regarding the construction of eight thermal power plants in Iran, with a total installed capacity of 2,800 Megawatts (MW). The investment per MW will be $3.57 million ($10 billion in total).

Privatization

Mapna Company. Sahand, Bistoun, Shazand, Shahid Montazeri, Tous, Shahid Rajaei and Neishabour power stations are among the profit-making plants, work on privatizing them will be finalized by late March 2007. Jahrom, Khalij-e Fars (Persian Gulf) and Sahand power plants will be ceded to the private sector in 2009. All domestic power plants will be privatized gradually, except those the government feels it should run to ensure security of the national electricity grid. Power plants of Damavand, Mashhad, Shirvan, Kerman, Khalij-e Fars, Abadan, Bisotoon, Sanandaj, Manjil and Binalood, which have been turned into public limited firms, are ready for privatization. As of 2010, 20 power plants were ready for privatization in Iran. Upon ceding the 20 power plants to IPO, some 40 percent of the capacity of power plants nationwide will be assigned to the private and cooperative sectors. As of 2011, about 45 power plants across the country were to be handed over to the private sector. In 2012, it was announced that Iran's government which has already turned over 17 of its 45 power plants to the private sector since 2008, will transfer 28 more plants with an estimated value of $11.4 billion (USD), by March 2013.

Energy/electricity bourse

The new energy/electricity bourse will be inaugurated in 2012. This will bring about more competition and transparency in Iran’s electricity market. Experts believe that following the launch of the subsidies reform plan, the electricity industry will undergo significant changes and will become more appealing to private investors. Iran is the 16th electricity producer in the world.

As at 2012, Iran had over 400 power plant units and 38 electricity distribution companies which buy the electricity from producers. Iran has over 100 companies which consume more than 20 MW of electricity per year. The average price of each kilowatt of electricity is 450 rials (around 5 cents) during the first phase of the Subsidy Reform Law. The average final price of each kilowatt of electricity will be 1000 rials (around 10 cents) in 2015. According to the government of Iran, power stations have to pay the export price of gas if they want to export electricity and must improve efficiency.

Iran's electricity export and related technical and engineering services exports was valued at $4 billion in 2011. In 2010, the total of Iran’s electricity exports to Afghanistan, Iraq (650 MW), Azerbaijan, Armenia, Pakistan and Turkey reached 878 megawatts and the total of imports from Armenia (237 MW) and Turkmenistan was recorded at 463 megawatts. Jordan, India, Oman, Qatar, Russia, Syria, and the UAE are the new countries that have expressed interest in buying electricity from Iran.

Waste to energy

Fossil

Geothermal

Hydroelectric

In service

Proposed or under construction

Pumped storage hydroelectric

Nuclear

In service

Under construction

Solar

In service
With about 300 clear sunny days a year and an average of 2,200 kilowatt-hour solar radiation per square meter, Iran has a great potential to tap solar energy.

Under construction

Tidal and wave power

Wind

Others

Decentralized power generation
In addition to the above power plants, there was 1800 MW cumulative installed capacity in 2011, which belonged to small scale decentralized power plants, some of which were not connected to the national grid, and many being privately built and run. This capacity is planned for increase to more than 10,000 MW with emphasis on renewable energy and trigeneration. Similarly there was 418 MW of capacity belonging to diesel generator based plants supplying hard to reach areas.

See also 

 International rankings of Iran
 Iranian Economic Reform Plan
 Energy in Iran

References

External links 

 Iran Water & Power Development Company
 List of dams in Iran
 Tavanir - Iran's Electric Power Generation Organization
 Energy Exchange of Iran
Specialized reports
 Iran Power Market Outlook to 2030, 55-page report, 2012
 Iran power, 57-page report, 2010
 Thermal Power Market Outlook in Iran to 2020, 78-page report, 2010
Videos
 Bushehr I and II Nuclear Power Plant, Iran

Electric power in Iran
Power Stations
Power Stations
Iran